Virginia Yleana Baeza Estrella (born 18 June 1965) is a Mexican politician affiliated with the National Action Party. She served as Deputy of the LIX Legislature of the Mexican Congress representing Yucatán.

References

1965 births
Living people
Politicians from Yucatán (state)
People from Mérida, Yucatán
Women members of the Chamber of Deputies (Mexico)
National Action Party (Mexico) politicians
Mérida Institute of Technology alumni
21st-century Mexican politicians
21st-century Mexican women politicians
Deputies of the LIX Legislature of Mexico
Members of the Chamber of Deputies (Mexico) for Yucatán